Moneeb Iqbal (born 28 February 1986) is a Scottish cricketer. He is a right-handed batsman and leg-break bowler. Having first represented Scotland in 2002, making his debut at the age of fifteen in the 2002 Under-19 World Cup, he represented the national team in the same competition in 2004 and 2006.

Though he scored a duck in his first match for the Scottish team, he finished the competition with an average nearing 20. He performed better two years later, when he hit his first half-century, and played once again in 2006.

At the time of his first international fixture, Moneeb was the youngest cricketer ever to represent Scotland in an international. He became a member of Durham's cricketing academy in 2004, and played his debut first-class match in May 2006, having represented the Second XI since 2004. Iqbal is a lower-order batsman for the second team, and plays in the tailend in first-class cricket.

Iqbal's brother-in-law, Mohammad Ramzan, is a onetime Pakistani Test cricketer.

References

External links
 

1986 births
Scottish cricketers
Scotland One Day International cricketers
Scotland Twenty20 International cricketers
Durham cricketers
Scottish people of Pakistani descent
Cricketers from Glasgow
Living people
British Asian cricketers
British sportspeople of Pakistani descent